Shishuang Temple is a Buddhist temple located in the town of Jingang, Liuyang, Hunan, China. In ancient times, Shishuang Temple, Daowu Temple, Baogai Temple and Daguang Temple were called "Four Buddhist Temples in Liuyang".

History
Shishuang Temple was first built in the Qianfu period (874–888) of the Tang dynasty (618–907).  Emperor Xizong granted the land and the then Prime Minister Pei Xiu supervised the construction of the temple.  Li Zhen, the third son of Emperor Xizong, received ordination as a monk at the temple.

During the Song dynasty (960–1279),  served as abbot.  His disciples  and  founded the Yangqi sect and Huanglong sect, respectively.  Japanese monks Eisai and  came to the temple to study Linji school.

Shishuang Temple went into decline in the Yuan and Ming dynasties (1271–1644).

In 1735, in the 13th year of Yongzheng Emperor's reign during the Qing dynasty (1644–1911), monks rebuilt the Grand Buddha Hall. The Shanmen and corridor were restored in 1794, in the ruling of Qianlong Emperor. And the Great Mercy Pavilion was renovated in 1879.

In 1923, monks refurbished the Mahavira Hall.

After the Cultural Revolution, in 1978, the local government repaired the Shanmen, Four Heavenly Kings Hall, Mahavira Hall, Guanyin Hall, Jade Buddha Hall, Buddhist Texts Library, Guru Hall, etc. In 1991, Shi Weiyi, a Taiwanese monk, raised funds to build the Shanmen Hall. The Dining Hall and Meditation Hall were added to the temple in 1993. In 2014, Shishuang Temple has been categorized as an AAA level tourist site by the China National Tourism Administration.

Architecture
The entire temple faces south with the Shanmen, Four Heavenly Kings Hall, Mahavira Hall, and the Guanyin Hall along the central axis of the complex. There are over 10 halls and rooms on both sides, including Guru Hall, Jade Buddha Hall, Abbot Hall, Monastic Dining Hall, Monastic Reception Hall and Meditation Hall.

Ten Thousand Buddha Pagoda
Ten thousand of golden and spectacular small Buddha statues are enshrined on the walls of the Ten Thousand Buddha Pagoda.

Gallery

References

Bibliography

Buddhist temples in Changsha
Buildings and structures in Liuyang
Tourist attractions in Changsha
20th-century establishments in China
20th-century Buddhist temples